Adlai Byron "By" Wimberly (September 3, 1892 – May 12, 1956) was an American football player and coach of football, basketball, and baseball. He played college football at Washington & Jefferson College and professionally for the Detroit Panthers of the National Football League (NFL). Wimberly served as the head football coach at Westminster College in New Wilmington, Pennsylvania (1919), Illinois Wesleyan University (1921–1922), and Washington University in St. Louis (1923–1924), compiling a career college football coaching record of 19–18–4. He was also the head basketball coach at Illinois Wesleyan from 1921 to 1923, tallying a mark of 30–11, and the baseball coach at the school in 1922 and 1925. Wimberly later worked as a manufacturer's representative. He died on May 12, 1956 in Detroit, Michigan.

Head coaching record

Football

References

External links
 

1892 births
1956 deaths
American football guards
American football tackles
American men's basketball coaches
Detroit Panthers players
Illinois Wesleyan Titans baseball coaches
Illinois Wesleyan Titans football coaches
Illinois Wesleyan Titans men's basketball coaches
Washington & Jefferson Presidents football players
Washington University Bears football coaches
Westminster Titans football coaches
College men's basketball head coaches in the United States
People from Stevenson, Alabama
Coaches of American football from Alabama
Players of American football from Alabama
Basketball coaches from Alabama